Ralph Morement (1924-1982) was an English footballer, who played as a wing half in the Football League for Sheffield United, Chester and Rochdale.

References

Chester City F.C. players
Sheffield United F.C. players
Rochdale A.F.C. players
Association football wing halves
English Football League players
1924 births
Footballers from Sheffield
1982 deaths
English footballers